Scottish-born Clifford Glen Porter (5 May 1899 in Edinburgh – 12 November 1976 in Wellington) was a New Zealand rugby union player. Playing as a wing forward, he represented Wellington at a provincial level and captained the New Zealand national side, the All Blacks. He represented New Zealand in 41 international matches, seven of them at full test level, scoring 16 tries.

Porter replaced Ces Badeley as captain of the New Zealand team, leading them on the 1924-5 tour during which they gained the name of The Invincibles, winning all 32 of the matches they played.

External links

1899 births
1976 deaths
New Zealand international rugby union players
People educated at Wellington College (New Zealand)
New Zealand rugby union players
Rugby union players from Edinburgh
Scottish emigrants to New Zealand
Rugby union wing-forwards